The railway network in New Zealand consists of four main lines, six secondary lines and numerous short branch lines in almost every region. It links all major urban centres except Nelson, Taupo, Queenstown, Whakatane and (since 2012) Gisborne. The network is owned and managed by KiwiRail. The network was constructed starting in 1863, mostly by government bodies, initially provincial governments and later the central government (usually by the Public Works Department) under the New Zealand Railways Department (NZR or NZGR). In 1981 NZR was corporatised as the New Zealand Railways Corporation, and in 1991 New Zealand Rail Limited was split from the corporation. New Zealand Rail was privatised in 1993 (and later renamed Tranz Rail), with the New Zealand Railways Corporation retaining the land (due to Treaty of Waitangi claims on land taken for railway construction). In 2003 the government renationalised the network. KiwiRail operates all freight lines and a small number of passenger services primarily for tourists on certain routes in both islands; Auckland One Rail operates Auckland Transport "AT Metro" suburban passenger trains in Auckland and Transdev operates Metlink passenger trains in the Wellington region; Dunedin Railways (formerly Taieri Gorge Railway) operates tourist passenger trains in Dunedin.

New Zealand national rail network

Lines in bold type are currently operated by KiwiRail

Main trunk lines

The last two lines are sometimes referred to as the South Island Main Trunk Railway.

Secondary main lines

Branch lines

Northland

Auckland

Suburban passenger rail lines

Waikato / Coromandel

Bay of Plenty

Gisborne – Hawke's Bay

Central North Island

Taranaki

Manawatu

Wairarapa

Wellington

Suburban rail lines

Nelson

Westland

Canterbury

Otago

Southland

Private lines
Parts of the network were constructed by private companies, and most were unsuccessful. All except the Whakatane Board Mills line and the Sanson Tramway were later acquired by the government. The most successful was the Wellington and Manawatu Railway, which operated between Wellington and Longburn (near Palmerston North) from 1885 to 1908. After the WMR, perhaps the best-known private railway was the New Zealand Midland Railway Company, which constructed parts of the Midland, Nelson and West Coast lines. After the company was dissolved in 1900 the railway lines and their construction were taken over by the government. Some lines were built by companies for access such as to coal mines, and by local government bodies.
 Cape Foulwind Branch
 Castlecliff Railway
 Fernhill Branch
 Hutt Park Railway
 Kaitangata Line 	
 Kakanui McDonald Limeworks Branch
 Kurow Branch (Duntroon – Hakataramea portion)
 Mokai Tramway (TTT Co line, Putāruru to Mokai near Lake Taupō)
 New Zealand Midland Railway Company Limited
 Ohai Railway Board
 Port Chalmers Railway Company Limited
 Riccarton Racecourse Siding
 Rakaia and Ashburton Forks Railway Limited
 Sanson Tramway
 Taratu Railway (Lovells Flat) 
 Thames Valley and Rotorua Railway Company
 Waronui (Coal) Railway (Milton)
 Waimate Gorge Branch
 Waimea Plains Railway
 Wellington and Manawatu Railway Company Limited
 Whakatane Board Mills Line
 Wilton Colleries Line

Significant proposals

Many railway lines have been proposed, especially in the 19th century, but never constructed. An 1873 map indicated that it was intended to link up all the current and authorised routes into a national network. Some proposals have been particularly significant due to their extent, publicity, or how close they came to being realised (in some cases, the track bed was built).  Some significant proposals include:
 Auckland Airport Line – an extension of the Onehunga Branch to Auckland Airport, and/or a link from the airport to the NIMT at Puhinui. Other options also mooted.
 Auckland City Rail Link – underground rail link under central Auckland. Now an active project
Avondale - Southdown Line (land corridor owned by KiwiRail)
Canterbury Interior Main Line
Connection of the Catlins River Branch and the Tokanui Branch
Cromwell – Queenstown, proposed connection with the Kingston Branch extension before Otago Central Railway route chosen.
Culverden – Reefton line
Culverden to Tophouse, with branches from there to Nelson and Blenheim
Dunedin Peninsula and Ocean Beach railway extension to Portobello and Taiaroa Heads.
Extension of the East Coast Main Trunk Railway to link Gisborne and Rotorua by going inland from Opotiki up the Waiweka Gorge to the Moutohora Branch. So would link the Bay of Plenty to Gisborne and Palmerston North via the Palmerston North – Gisborne Line.  
Fairlie Branch – extension 27 km beyond Eversley, proposals to terminate the line in Burkes Pass 
East Cape tourist line via Hicks Bay 
Haywards–Plimmerton Line between the Hutt Valley Line and the Kapiti Line.
Kakahi – Pūkawa (Lake Taupō) line
Kennington – Waikiwi deviation to Invercargill
Kingston Branch – extension to  Queenstown
Kirikopuni – Kaikohe line
Kurow Branch – extension beyond Hakataramea
Lewis Pass Railway (Reefton to Culverden)
Little River Branch – extension to Akaroa
Marsden Point Branch and its Waipu precursor
Martinborough Branch
 Masterton – Waipukurau line via either Pongaroa or Castlepoint
Mossburn Branch – extension to Te Anau
Motueka to Tadmor
Nelson – Blenheim line
Extension of the Nelson Section through the Buller Gorge to the West Coast.
Nelson to Cobden and Westport
North Shore Line – from central Auckland (Britomart) to the North Shore, and extended northward on the route currently occupied by the Northern Busway
Okaihau Branch – extension to Rangiahua and Kaitaia
Opunake Branch – sub-branch from Kapuni to Manaia; extension to New Plymouth
Otago Central Railway – extension to Wānaka
Paengaroa – Rotorua line
Paeroa–Pokeno Line 
Ross – Haast, including rebuilding to heavy rail of the Stewart and Chapman tramway to Lake Ianthe State Forest. 
Roxburgh Branch – connection from Roxburgh to the Otago Central Railway in Alexandra
Sockburn-Styx deviation and industrial line.
Taupō Railway Proposals – connections from Rotorua, Kinleith or Murupara branches
Te Aro Extension – extension to Island Bay
Waiau Branch – extension to Kaikoura
Waimate Branch – extension of the Waihao Downs line
Wainuiomata Branch – from the Hutt Valley section of the Wairarapa Line to the suburb.  
Wairau Valley Railway from Tophouse to Blenheim
Westport to Charleston

See also Hawera & Normanby Star| volume=LVII, 23 August 1910, Page 5 for a list of railways authorised, proposed and under construction, with estimated cost of completing them as at 1 April 1910, many of which were not built.

Nelson – Blenheim notional railway
The Nelson - Blenheim notional railway was created in November 1957 to help manage the political backlash from the 1955 closure of the isolated Nelson Section.   between Nelson and Blenheim was deemed by law to be an NZR railway for the purposes of calculating passenger and freight rates between railway stations in the South Island and Nelson or other places on the notional railway.  Passengers and freight travelled by road, with the difference between the road carrier's rates and railway rates subsidised by the government.  Rail rates were significantly cheaper than road rates, so the scheme provided significant benefits to its users, while imposing significant costs on the government.  The scheme lasted for 22 years, being withdrawn in October 1977.

Bush tramways
Bush tramways were industrial tramway lines principally constructed to haul timber or minerals, often in isolated areas. A variety of gauges was used, including the New Zealand standard . Typical bush trams were more lightly constructed than ordinary rail lines and had steeper gradients and sharper curves. With the low speeds that were commonplace, rolling stock and locomotives were generally built to lighter standards than main-line vehicles. It was not uncommon for road vehicles to be adapted, either as haulage power or rolling stock. As road vehicles became more suited for these operations the bush trams gradually faded away and none are now operating.

A prominent example of a bush tramway was the Taupo Totara Timber Company's line between Putaruru and Mokai, and an example of a mineral tramway was the Dun Mountain Railway.

Other bush and mineral tramways included -

North Island

South Island

Street tramways
Major street tramway networks were constructed in Auckland, Wellington, Christchurch and Dunedin, with smaller operations in Gisborne, Napier, New Plymouth, Wanganui,  Nelson and Invercargill. Employing horse, steam or electric power, they operated in most cases until the 1950s when improved buses saw most of the tracks scrapped. Urban tram operations, built from scratch as tourist attractions, have more recently been restarted in Christchurch (1995)  Auckland (2011), and Wanganui (2013). See Trams in New Zealand.

Heritage and Private railways
A large number of societies operate working heritage railway lines and museums. Most of these are run largely or wholly by volunteer labour, except commercially operated private trust owned Dunedin Railways in Dunedin, which employs paid staff.

References

Bibliography

Further reading 

 

New Zealand
 
Lines
Railway lines in New Zealand